Vicious Cycle Software was an American video game development company based in Morrisville, North Carolina.

History
Vicious Cycle was founded in 2000 by Eric Peterson, Dave Ellis, Marc Racine and Wayne Harvey after layoffs at the local MicroProse development studio (then a Hasbro Interactive studio) forced several game developers into finding other work.  Racine resigned as Vice President and Director of Production in the Spring of 2005 to pursue other ventures. Ellis left the company in the Summer of 2000, but returned in 2005 to take a position as game designer. Vicious Cycle has released titles for the PlayStation 2, Xbox, GameCube, Xbox 360, PlayStation 3, Wii, and PlayStation Portable systems as well as the Microsoft Windows platform.

In 2005, Vicious Cycle announced the opening of their Monkey Bar Games division.  Monkey Bar Games was focused on providing mass-market games to gamers of all ages. Monkey Bar Games released video games incorporating licensed characters from Ben 10, Dora the Explorer, and Curious George. A game was also released in late 2006 to coincide with the release of the Flushed Away animated feature film.

Also in 2005, Vicious Cycle announced the release of their Vicious Engine game engine. The Vicious Engine is a complete game development middleware solution for the PlayStation 2, PlayStation 3, Xbox, Xbox 360, PlayStation Portable, GameCube, Wii and Microsoft Windows. The Vicious Engine is one of the first game engines to offer full support for the PSP and Wii platforms.

On June 20, 2007, Vicious Cycle was acquired by D3 Publisher, making Vicious Cycle Software a subsidiary of D3Publisher of America and a second‐tier subsidiary of D3 Inc. Vicious Cycle released Eat Lead: The Return of Matt Hazard for Xbox 360 and PlayStation 3 on February 26, 2009. On October 1, 2009, they announced Matt Hazard: Blood Bath and Beyond for Xbox LIVE Arcade and the PlayStation Store for winter 2009.

The second version of the Vicious Engine, Ve2, was released on March 25, 2009, at the Game Developers Conference. It specifically features improvements for the Xbox 360 and PlayStation 3.

In Spring of 2014, Vicious Cycle was acquired by Little Orbit.

As the final two games (Adventure Time: Finn & Jake Investigations and Kung Fu Panda: Showdown of Legendary Legends) neared completion, several rounds of layoffs reduced the studio to a skeleton crew. Vicious Cycle closed its doors permanently in January 2016.

Products

References

External links 
 Vicious Cycle Software official site 
 Monkey Bar Games official site
 Vicious Engine official site
Vicious Cycle Software entry at MobyGames

Former Bandai Namco Holdings subsidiaries
Defunct video game companies of the United States
Video game development companies
Video game companies established in 2000
Video game companies disestablished in 2016
Defunct companies based in North Carolina
2000 establishments in North Carolina
2016 disestablishments in North Carolina